Justin Crawford (born February 19, 1995) is a former American football running back. He played college football at West Virginia.

Crawford graduated Hardaway High School in Columbus, Georgia. He first attended Northwest Mississippi Community College before transferring to West Virginia. In two seasons at WVU, Crawford ran for 1,184 yards (2016) and 1,061 yards (2017). He skipped the team's bowl game to avoid injury and prepare for the 2018 NFL draft.

Professional career
Crawford signed with the Atlanta Falcons as an undrafted free agent on May 1, 2018. He was waived on September 1, 2018. He had signed with the Atlanta Legends in October 2018, but was waived after his arrest.

Personal
Crawford was arrested on October 13, 2018, for incest, sodomy, and enticing a child for indecent purpose after his wife found him standing over a minor in their home. On September 17, 2019, Crawford was sentenced to twelve years in prison after pleading guilty to the crimes.

References

1995 births
Living people
Players of American football from Columbus, Georgia
American football running backs
Northwest Mississippi Rangers football players
West Virginia Mountaineers football players
Atlanta Falcons players
Atlanta Legends players